11 Harrowhouse is a 1974 British heist comedy thriller film directed by Aram Avakian and starring Charles Grodin, Candice Bergen, James Mason, Trevor Howard, and John Gielgud in Panavision. It was adapted by Charles Grodin based upon the novel by Gerald A. Browne with the screenplay by Jeffrey Bloom. It was made at Pinewood Studios with extensive location shooting in London, Ragley Hall in Warwickshire and at Quainton Road railway station. The film's sets were designed by the art director Peter Mullins. The hand of Assistant Art Director John Siddall was used to paint the cockroaches.

Plot
In England, a small-time diamond merchant (Charles Grodin) is unexpectedly offered the chance to supervise the purchase and cutting of an extremely large diamond to be named after its wealthy owner (Trevor Howard). When the diamond is stolen from him, he is blackmailed into pulling off a major heist at "The System," located at 11 Harrowhouse Street, City of London with the help of his beautiful and wealthy girlfriend (Candice Bergen). The key figure in the theft, however, is the inside man, Watts (James Mason) who works in the vault at The System. Watts is dying of cancer and wants to leave his family financially secure.

Although "The System" has an elaborate network of defences and alarms against intruders, the robbery is carried out at night by gaining access to the roof from an adjacent property and threading a hosepipe down a conduit into the vault, where Watts uses it to vacuum up thousands of rough diamonds out of their drawers. The thieves leave before the robbery is discovered, and when found in the vault in the morning, Watts claims to have eaten the gems. Before he can confess, Watts deliberately swallows poison and dies at 11 Harrowhouse Street. Most of the loot is buried in concrete, to prevent it flooding the market.

Cast
 Charles Grodin as Howard R. Chesser
 Candice Bergen as Maren Shirell
 James Mason as Charles D. Watts
 Trevor Howard as Clyde Massey
 John Gielgud as Meecham, the head man at the System
 Helen Cherry as Lady Bolding
 Peter Vaughan as Coglin
 Cyril Shaps as Wildenstein
 Leon Greene as Toland
 Jack Watson as Miller
 Jack Watling as Fitzmaurice
 Clive Morton as Sir Harold
 Larry Cross as Whitman
 John Siddall as Hands used to paint the cockroaches

Reviews
Variety gave the film a negative review, stating that "Grodin messes up the film with ineffective shy-guy acting, and clobbers it with catatonic voice-over that is supposed to be funny" and adding that "Howard and Mason appear close to embarrassed in their roles."

Versions
The film has been screened in two versions in the past - both with and without narration from Grodin's character, H.R. Chesser. The version without narration plays under two alternate titles, either Anything for Love or Fast Fortune.  Neither version was broadcast often on television; the version without the narration was the most widely available for purchase for a time.  The film was released on LaserDisc by Fox Video in Widescreen format and with the narration intact.

Home media
On 2 February 2011, Shout! Factory released the film on Region 1 DVD.

See also
Heist film

References

External links
 
 
 
 

1974 films
1970s crime comedy films
1970s thriller films
British crime comedy films
British heist films
Films directed by Aram Avakian
1970s English-language films
Films set in London
Films shot in London
Films shot in Warwickshire
Films shot in Buckinghamshire
Films set in Antwerp
20th Century Fox films
1974 comedy films
Films produced by Elliott Kastner
1970s British films